Istvan Lovaszy is a male former international table tennis player from Hungary.

Table tennis career
He won a silver medal at the 1937 World Table Tennis Championships in the Swaythling Cup (men's team event) with Viktor Barna, Laszlo Bellak, Ferenc Soos and Miklós Szabados.

See also
 List of table tennis players
 List of World Table Tennis Championships medalists

References

Hungarian male table tennis players
World Table Tennis Championships medalists